The 2013 Utah State Aggies football team represented Utah State University in the 2013 NCAA Division I FBS football season. The Aggies were led by new head coach Matt Wells and played their home games at Merlin Olsen Field at Romney Stadium. This was the Aggies first season as members of the Mountain West Conference in the Mountain Division.

Before the season

2013 recruits

Blue-White Spring Game presented by Orbit Irrigation Products
The Spring Game will take place on April 20, 2013, featuring the squad divided into a blue team and a white team.

Departures
Among the departures are a former head coach Gary Andersen, who left to be the head coach of Wisconsin. A number of other coaches left with him.

NFL Draft

Roster

Schedule

Game Summaries

Utah

Sources:

Air Force

Sources:

Weber State

Sources:

USC

Sources:

San Jose State

Sources:

BYU

Sources:

Boise State

Sources:

New Mexico

Sources:

Hawaii

UNLV

Colorado State

Wyoming

Sources:

Fresno State
Sources:

Northern Illinois
Sources:

References

Utah State
Utah State Aggies football seasons
Poinsettia Bowl champion seasons
Utah State Aggies football